Acoustic and Auditory Phonetics is a textbook by Keith Allan Johnson designed for an introductory course in phonetics.

Reception
The book was reviewed by Rungpat Roengpitya, Hans Grassegger and David M. Howard.

References

External links
Acoustic and Auditory Phonetics

Phonetics books
Linguistics textbooks
1997 non-fiction books
Wiley (publisher) books